The 2022 Jersey Shore 150 was an NASCAR Whelen Modified Tour race that was held on July 9, 2022. It was contested over 150 laps on the  oval. It was the 8th race of the 2022 NASCAR Whelen Modified Tour season. Jimmy Blewett, driving for owner Tommy Baldwin, got his first win of the season.

Report

Entry list 

 (R) denotes rookie driver.
 (i) denotes driver who is ineligible for series driver points.

Practice

Qualifying

Qualifying results

Race 

Laps: 150

Race statistics 

 Lead changes: 4
 Cautions/Laps: 4 for 26 laps
 Time of race: 0:43:12
 Average speed: 68.75 mph

References 

2022 NASCAR Whelen Modified Tour
2022 in sports in New Jersey
Jersey Shore 150
Wall Township, New Jersey